Bayturovo (Baytur) is a rural locality (a village) in Kameyevsky Selsoviet, Mishkinsky District, Bashkortostan, Russia. The population was 273 as of 2010. There are 6 streets.

Geography 
Bayturovo is located 24 km southeast of Mishkino (the district's administrative centre) by road. Bishtinovo is the nearest rural locality.

References 

Rural localities in Mishkinsky District